Bielsko  is a village in the administrative district of Gmina Koczała, within Człuchów County, Pomeranian Voivodeship, in northern Poland.

The village has a population of 471.

See also
History of Pomerania

References

Bielsko